Queen Anne Bridge is an historic  bridge over the Patuxent River near Queen Anne in Prince George's County, Maryland in the United States of America. It is the only surviving example of a Pratt truss bridge with Phoenix sections in the county.

Numerous bridges have been built on this site that once served as a main road connecting Anne Arundel County to Prince George's County. The first one was built in 1755 and by 1797 another wood bridge was built by local carpenter Colmor Duvall, only to be destroyed by a flood in June 1804.  In 1804, the bridge was immediately rebuilt.  The current structure was built about 1890 and was closed after the Anne Arundel span of the bridge collapsed due to an overloaded truck, circa 1960.  It remained open for pedestrian use until 2007 and remains standing, though fences now prevent it from even allowing pedestrian use between county park land on both sides of the river.

References

Bridges in Anne Arundel County, Maryland
Bridges in Prince George's County, Maryland
Bridges completed in 1890
Landmarks in Maryland
Road bridges in Maryland
Steel bridges in the United States
Pratt truss bridges in the United States
1890 establishments in Maryland
Patuxent River